Murex tenuirostrum is a species of sea snail, a marine gastropod mollusk in the family Muricidae, the murex snails or rock snails.

Subspecies
 Murex tenuirostrum africanus Ponder & E. H. Vokes, 1988: synonym of Murex africanus Ponder & E. H. Vokes, 1988

Description

Distribution
This marine species occurs off Papua New Guinea.

References

Gastropods described in 1822
Murex